The buff-bellied tanager (Thlypopsis inornata) is a species of bird in the family Thraupidae.

Distribution and habitat
It is found in Peru and far southern Ecuador.  Its natural habitat is subtropical or tropical high-altitude shrubland.

References

buff-bellied tanager
Birds of the Peruvian Andes
buff-bellied tanager
buff-bellied tanager
Taxonomy articles created by Polbot